Saint-Jacques was a federal electoral district in Quebec, Canada, that was represented in the House of Commons of Canada from 1953 to 1988.

There were two separate ridings named "Saint-Jacques". The first was created in 1952 from Cartier and St. James ridings. It was abolished in 1976 when it was redistributed into Laurier and Saint-Henri ridings.

A second "Saint-Jacques" riding was created in 1977 when Saint-Henri was renamed Saint-Jacques. It was abolished in 1987 when it was redistributed into Laurier—Sainte-Marie, Saint-Henri—Westmount and Verdun—Saint-Paul ridings.

Members of Parliament

This riding elected the following Members of Parliament:

Election results

Saint-Jacques, 1953–1979

Saint-Jacques, 1979–1988

See also 

 List of Canadian federal electoral districts
 Past Canadian electoral districts

External links 
 Riding history (1952 - 1976) from the Library of Parliament
 Riding history (1977 - 1987) from the Library of Parliament

Former federal electoral districts of Quebec